Naba Kishore Ray (1940- 2013) was an Indian theoretical and computational chemist, known for his studies on structure of molecules. Born on 5 December 1940 in the Indian state of Odisha, he studied molecules using molecular orbital and floating spherical gaussian orbital methods and his work on the nature of electron density and momentum distribution in atoms and molecules as well as molecular reactivitity on surfaces are reported to have widened the understanding of the subjects. The Council of Scientific and Industrial Research, the apex agency of the Government of India for scientific research, awarded him the Shanti Swarup Bhatnagar Prize for Science and Technology, one of the highest Indian science awards, in 1983, for his contributions to chemical sciences.

See also 
 Theoretical chemistry
 Computational chemistry

References

External links 
 

Recipients of the Shanti Swarup Bhatnagar Award in Chemical Science
1940 births
Indian scientific authors
Scientists from Odisha
Fellows of the Indian Academy of Sciences
20th-century Indian chemists
Academic staff of the Indian Institute of Science
Indian theoretical chemists
Indian computational chemists
2013 deaths